The 1999 European Karate Championships, the 34th edition, was held  in Chalkida, Greece from May 21 to 23, 1999.

Medallists

Men's competition

Individual

Team

Women's competition

Individual

Team

Medagliere

References

External links
 Karate Records - European Championship 1999

1999
International sports competitions hosted by Greece
European Karate Championships
European championships in 1999
Karate competitions in Greece
Martial arts in Greece